"I'm a Wonderful Thing, Baby" is a 1982 song by Kid Creole and the Coconuts from their album Tropical Gangsters. It was the first single released from Tropical Gangsters and their first major hit reaching a peak of no. 4 in the UK Singles Chart. It also reached no. 18 on the US Club Play chart.

In 1993, the single was remixed by Brothers in Rhythm and released as a single to promote the compilation album Cre~Olé: The Best of Kid Creole & the Coconuts.

Track listing

1993 re-release

Charts

A"I'm a Wonderful Thing, Baby", "I'm Corrupt" and "Annie, I'm Not Your Daddy" charted together on the Billboard Hot Dance Club Play chart.

References

1982 singles
1993 singles
Kid Creole and the Coconuts songs
ZE Records singles
Songs written by August Darnell
1982 songs